Celestino "Chuck" Robert Pennoni (born December 31, 1937) is an American engineer and academic who currently serves as the chairman of Pennoni Associates Inc., a consulting engineering firm headquartered in Philadelphia. He has also served as interim president of Drexel University twice, from 1994 to 1995 and 2009 to 

2010.

Early life
Celestino "Chuck" Pennoni is the youngest of five children and only son of immigrants from Perugia, Italy, Annavillia and Celestino. He was raised in  Plains Township, Luzerne County, and graduated from Plains Township High School in Northeastern Pennsylvania. Pennoni received his B.S. and M.S. degree in civil engineering from Drexel University.

Drexel University
Pennoni has served as trustee to the university from 1993 to 2006, and as chairman of the board from 1997 to 2003. In March 2003, Drexel University's honors college was named the Pennoni Honors College.

Pennoni served as interim president at Drexel from 1994 to 1995, as well as from 2009 to 2010. In 1995, he was succeeded by Constantine Papadakis, and in August 2010, he was succeeded by John Anderson Fry.

Honors
In 2000, Pennoni was elected a member of the National Academy of Engineering "For advancing innovative principles in the art and science of engineering, engineering education, and engineering management".

Pennoni was named as the 52nd recipient of the Drexel University Business Leader of the Year award in 2005.

References

External links
C. R. "Chuck" Pennoni at Drexel University
Pennoni Associates Inc.

Living people
American civil engineers
Drexel University alumni
1937 births